John Long (February 26, 1785 – August 11, 1857) was a North Carolina politician who served four terms (1821–1829) in the U.S. House of Representatives.

Long also served one term (1811–12) in the North Carolina House of Commons and one term (1814–15) in the North Carolina Senate.

John Long was born in Loudoun County, Virginia on February 26, 1785.  He married Sabra Shepard Ramsey on May 6, 1807, in Cumberland County, North Carolina.  Long died on August 11, 1857.

External links
Congressional Biography

People from Loudoun County, Virginia
1785 births
1857 deaths
North Carolina National Republicans
Democratic-Republican Party members of the United States House of Representatives from North Carolina
National Republican Party members of the United States House of Representatives
19th-century American politicians